Grass Valley is a census-designated place (CDP) in northeastern Pershing County, Nevada, United States. As of the 2010 census the population was 1,161.

Geography
The CDP is named after the valley in which it lies, a  basin between the Sonoma Range to the east and the East Range to the west. Nevada State Route 294 (Grass Valley Road) runs from Grass Valley into Winnemucca.

Demographics

See also

 List of census-designated places in Nevada

References

Census-designated places in Pershing County, Nevada
Census-designated places in Nevada